Charles Schillings is a Belgian House DJ, based in France. He has worked with Pschent Music since 1996.

Biography

Charles Schillings is known for mixing eclectic and melodic House with Rock, Electro-Funk, Soul, Groove and Jazz. He has played at Rex and the Queen (Paris), Le Café d'Anvers (Belgium), Lotus (New York) and Jet Set (Moscow).

His resume includes sound design for Karl Lagerfeld and French brand CELINE since 2006 along with spinning for special events for Calvin Klein, Louis Vuitton, Chopard and Armani.

Since signing with Pschent in 1996, he has mixed the six Overground House compilations, as well Club Pride and Elite Model's Attitude with Felix and Hugo Boss. Besides his DJ and compilation work, Charles Schillings is also a composer, recording and producing his own music.

His first album called, "It's About…", released in 2002, includes the single "Tengo Nada" with Clémentine Célarié. In 2004, Charles Schillings released his second album, "Not Correct", with singles "SPIN IT RIGHT" and "Not Correct".

Schillings's third album project is currently in production together with Villablack, which will be available in the course of the year.

Discography

Compilations :
Overground House vol. 1 à 6
Trip Do Brasil
Sérialement Vôtre
Groove Lift – Couleur 3
Groove from the underground – Aqua Recordings
Club Pride
Elite Model's Attitude (avec Felix)

Albums : 
« It's About… » - 2002
« Not Correct » - 2004
« Like A Radio » - 2010

Maxi :
King Of My Castle – Wamdue Project – Strictly Rhythm
Spin it Right – Pschent Music
Mulele – Pschent Music
Be gone –Pschent Music
Tengo Nada – Pschent Music
It’s about time – Pschent Music

References

Living people
French DJs
Year of birth missing (living people)
Place of birth missing (living people)
Belgian DJs